Lasionycta impingens is a moth of the family Noctuidae. It occurs from southern Yukon to Colorado.

It is diurnal. Adults are common in alpine tundra. It feeds on nectar of a Penstemon species on the Beartooth Plateau, Montana, as well as on Mertensia paniculata and a Senecio, likely Senecio lugens at Pink Mountain, British Columbia.

Adults are on wing in July and August.

Subspecies
Lasionycta impingens impingens (from southern Yukon southward in the Rocky Mountains to southern British Columbia and Alberta, and in southwestern British Columbia at Pavilion north of Lillooet)
Lasionycta impingens curta (in the Rocky Mountains from southern Montana to Colorado)

External links
A Revision of Lasionycta Aurivillius (Lepidoptera, Noctuidae) for North America and notes on Eurasian species, with descriptions of 17 new species, 6 new subspecies, a new genus, and two new species of Tricholita Grote

Lasionycta
Moths of North America
Moths described in 1857